Taraco, La Paz is a town in the La Paz Department, Bolivia.

References 

  Instituto Nacional de Estadistica de Bolivia  (INE)

Populated places in La Paz Department (Bolivia)